Sarasota County Area Transit (SCAT) provides public transportation for Sarasota County, Florida and is operated by the county. SCAT maintains 27 fixed-line bus routes plus a dial-a-ride paratransit service (SCAT Plus). The majority of the routes operate from Monday through Saturday with select service on Sundays.

Bus routes
SCAT operates 27 different local bus routes that serve the cities of Sarasota, Venice, North Port, the Town of Longboat Key, and other communities of Sarasota County. Additionally, service also extends into and is coordinated with Manatee County.

SCAT paratransit service is delivered by private vendor Ride Right, LLC which provides trips to qualified people who are unable to use the fixed route service, due to a disability or being transportation disadvantaged. Trips are door to door service to and from locations during the fixed route system's regular service hours. Americans with Disabilities Act (ADA) trips are provided in areas within a  distance of the fixed route system. Transportation Disadvantaged trips are provided to those who cannot access the fixed routed due to income, disability, or age.

SCAT also has bus rapid transit (BRT) service along US 41 from Sarasota–Bradenton International Airport to North Port.

Fleet
SCAT maintains a fleet of Gillig buses, including ten hybrid BRT buses that the agency purchased in 2006. SCAT also has a contingency fleet of Orion I and Orion V buses.

References

External links
Sarasota County Area Transit

Transportation in Sarasota County, Florida
Sarasota, Florida
Bus transportation in Florida
Bus rapid transit in Florida